Enclosed Alphanumeric Supplement is a Unicode block consisting of Latin alphabet characters and Arabic numerals enclosed in circles, ovals or boxes, used for a variety of purposes. It is encoded in the range U+1F100–U+1F1FF in the Supplementary Multilingual Plane.

The block is mostly an extension of the Enclosed Alphanumerics block, containing further enclosed alphanumeric characters which are not included in that block or Enclosed CJK Letters and Months. Most of the characters are single alphanumerics in boxes or circles, or with trailing commas. Two of the symbols are identified as dingbats. A number of multiple-letter enclosed abbreviations are also included, mostly to provide compatibility with Broadcast Markup Language standards (see ARIB STD B24 character set) and Japanese telecommunications networks' emoji sets. The block also includes the regional indicator symbols to be used for emoji country flag support.

Emoji
The Enclosed Alphanumeric Supplement block contains 41 emoji:
U+1F170, U+1F171, U+1F17E, U+1F17F, U+1F18E, U+1F191 – U+1F19A and U+1F1E6 – U+1F1FF.

The block has eight standardized variants defined to specify emoji-style (U+FE0F VS16) or text presentation (U+FE0E VS15) for the following four base characters: U+1F170, U+1F171, U+1F17E & U+1F17F. All of these base characters are defined as defaulting to a text presentation. Their appearance depends on the program (such as a browser) and the fonts used:

History
The following Unicode-related documents record the purpose and process of defining specific characters in the Enclosed Alphanumeric Supplement block:

References

See also 
 Enclosed Alphanumerics (Unicode block)

Alphanumeric Supplement